Shane Murray Endicott (born December 21, 1981) is a Canadian former professional ice hockey centre who played 45 games in the National Hockey League for the Pittsburgh Penguins.

Playing career
Endicott was drafted 52nd overall in the 2000 NHL Entry Draft by the Pittsburgh Penguins from the Seattle Thunderbirds of the Western Hockey League. He made his NHL debut directly from the Thunderbirds, playing in 4 games with the Penguins in the 2001–02 season before being sent to the Penguins' affiliate, the Wilkes-Barre/Scranton Penguins.

Endicott spent the next four years primarily playing for Wilkes-Barre/Scranton. In the 2005–06 season, Shane played 41 games in the NHL recording 1 goals and 1 assist. At the conclusion of the season, Endicott was bought-out from the final year of his contract with the Penguins.

On July 17, 2006, Endicott signed as a free agent with the Nashville Predators and was assigned to their affiliate, the Milwaukee Admirals. On January 26, 2007, Endicott was traded to the Anaheim Ducks for Chris Durno. Endicott's tenure with the Ducks was cut short on February 23, 2007, when he was traded to the Dallas Stars for future considerations. During this turbulent season, Endicott posted 5 goals and 10 assists in 56 games split between Milwaukee, Portland and Iowa.

On August 21, 2010, Endicott signed as a free agent from EVR Tower Stars of the German 2nd Bundesliga to a one-year contract with Italian team SG Pontebba.

Career statistics

References

External links

1981 births
Canadian ice hockey centres
Ice hockey people from Saskatchewan
Iowa Stars players
Living people
Milwaukee Admirals players
Oji Eagles players
Pittsburgh Penguins draft picks
Pittsburgh Penguins players
SG Pontebba players
Portland Pirates players
Ravensburg Towerstars players
Seattle Thunderbirds players
Sportspeople from Saskatoon
Wilkes-Barre/Scranton Penguins players